Jens Bäumer (born 9 August 1978) is a German former professional footballer who played as a midfielder. who presently serves as an assistant coach for Fredericksburg FC in the National Premier Soccer League.

References

1978 births
Living people
Sportspeople from Münster
Association football midfielders
German footballers
Germany under-21 international footballers
Bundesliga players
2. Bundesliga players
Karlsruher SC players
Karlsruher SC II players
Borussia Mönchengladbach players
Borussia Mönchengladbach II players
Rot Weiss Ahlen players
SC Preußen Münster players
RVA FC players
Footballers from North Rhine-Westphalia